Manangorai is a village in the Thanjavur taluk of Thanjavur district, Tamil Nadu, India. It is the only village inside Thanjavur to have an Engineering college.

Demographics 

As per the 2001 census, Manangorai had a total population of 1385 with 693 males and 692 females. The sex ratio was 999. The literacy rate was 82.92.

References 

 

Villages in Thanjavur district